Comfort and Happiness is the debut studio album by Polish singer Dawid Podsiadło. It was released on 28 May 2013 through Sony Music. It was produced by Bogdan Kondracki.

The album debuted at number one of the Polish Albums Chart OLiS, was certified triple Platinum in Poland, and became the number one best-selling album of 2013 in Poland.

Release and promotion
The album was released on 28 May 2013. It was promoted by the lead single "Trójkąty i kwadraty", released on 6 May 2013, and the second single "Nieznajomy", released on 16 September 2013. Following the release of the album, Podsiadło performed at Open'er Festival on 3 July 2013 as the artist opening the festival, and embarked on a national tour in September 2013.

On 26 November 2013, a re-issue of Comfort and Happiness (called the "Deluxe Edition") was released. It included three bonus tracks: "T.E.A", "Jump", and Podsiadło's third single from the album, "Powiedz mi, że nie chcesz". The Deluxe Edition of the album also included DVD disc containing Comfort and Happiness Tour – Making Of film, and music videos for the singles "Trójkąty i kwadraty" and "Nieznajomy".

On 16 June 2014, the fourth single from the album, titled "No", was released.

Track listing

Charts and certifications

Weekly charts

Year-end charts

Certifications

Release history

See also
 List of number-one albums of 2013 (Poland)

References

2013 debut albums
Dawid Podsiadło albums